Claude Buchon (born 9 February 1949) is a French former cyclist. He competed in the team time trial event at the 1976 Summer Olympics.

References

External links
 

1949 births
Living people
French male cyclists
Olympic cyclists of France
Cyclists at the 1976 Summer Olympics
Sportspeople from Saint-Brieuc
Cyclists from Brittany